Ştefan VI Rareş (died 1 September 1552) was ruler of Moldavia in 1551 and 1552.

Ştefan was a son of Petru Rareş and succeeded to the Moldavian throne on 11 June 1551 when his brother Ilie II Rareş was forced to abdicate by the Ottoman Empire.

He attempted to create an alliance with the German King Ferdinand I against the Ottomans, but was unsuccessful. He attempted an invasion of Transylvania in 1552, and when this failed he was assassinated by his boyars.

See also

 List of rulers of Moldavia

Place of birth missing
Year of birth missing
16th-century births
1552 deaths
16th-century monarchs in Europe
Assassinated royalty
Rulers of Moldavia
Moldovan people of Serbian descent